In the  season, ABC televised five weekly playoff telecasts (the first three weeks were regional coverage of various games and two national games) on Sunday afternoons starting on April 18. In the  season, ABC televised six weekly regional telecasts on Sunday afternoons beginning in March (or the last three Sundays of the regular season). ABC then televised three weeks worth of playoff games on first three Sundays.

Overall, ABC averaged a 1.7 rating for those two seasons.

Stanley Cup Finals

Regular season

All-Star Game

References

External links
NHL U.S. Television Ratings
Sports Media Watch: 2000s numbers game

ABC Sports
ABC